Devon Witherspoon  (born December 11, 2000) is an American football cornerback for the Illinois Fighting Illini. In 2022, he was a consensus All-American and named the Tatum–Woodson Defensive Back of the Year.

High school career
Witherspoon attended Pine Forest High School in Pensacola, Florida. He did not start playing football until his junior year of high school. As a senior in 2018, he was the Pensacola News Journal Defensive Player of the Year after recording 74 tackles, seven interceptions and two touchdowns. He committed to the University of Illinois Urbana-Champaign to play college football.

College career
As a true freshman at Illinois in 2019, Witherspoon played in all 13 games with three starts and had 33 tackles. As a sophomore in 2020, he played seven of the Illini's eight game season, recording 33 tackles and two interceptions. He played and started 10 games his junior year in 2021, finishing with 52 tackles and one sack. Witherspoon returned to Illinois his junior year in 2022 where he would be named a consensus All-American at the seasons conclusion.

References

External links
Illinois Fighting Illini bio

Living people
2000 births
All-American college football players
American football cornerbacks
Illinois Fighting Illini football players
Players of American football from Florida